Major General Karl Gottfrid Björck (31 May 1893 – 8 July 1981) was a Swedish Army officer. He served as Inspector of the Swedish Army Service Troops from 1946 to 1949, and as such, was chief of transportation of the White Buses operation to rescue concentration camp inmates in areas under Nazi control and transport them to Sweden.

Early life
Björck was born on 31 May 1893 in Bäckseda, Jönköping County, Sweden, the son of merchant Karl Björck and his wife Anna (née Jonsson). He passed studentexamen in 1913 and was commissioned into the Swedish Army Service Troops as a second lieutenant in 1915.

Career
Björck attended the Royal Swedish Army Staff College from 1922 to 1924 and served as captain in the General Staff from 1928 to 1934. In 1936, Björck was appointed aide-de-camp to His Majesty the King, and in 1941 he was appointed chief aide-de-camp (överadjutant) to His Majesty the King, a position he held until the king died in 1950.

He was promoted to lieutenant colonel in the Swedish Army Service Troops and was appointed commanding officer of Göta Logistic Corps (T 2) in 1939. Two years later, Björck was promoted to colonel in the Swedish Army Service Troops and assumed the position as head of the Information and Press Department of the Defence Staff. In 1942 he was appointed head of Logistic Department in the Army Inspectorate (Arméinspektionen). The same year Björck became a member of the Folkberedskapsnämnden ("National Preparedness Commission"). He was also a military member of Statens informationsstyrelse ("National Information Board") from 1942 to 30 June 1944 and chairman of the board of the Kungafonden ("The King's Fund") from 1943 to 1958.

Björck served as Inspector of the Swedish Army Service Troops from 1946 to 1949 when he was promoted to major general. While serving as Inspector of the Swedish Army Service Troops, Björck was appointed chief of transportation of the White Buses operation to rescue concentration camp inmates in areas under Nazi control and transport them to Sweden. In 1949, Björck became a member of the Statens organisationsnämnd ("National Organization Board") which he was until 1961. Björck worked as a consultant at the Swedish Agency for Administrative Development (Statskontoret) from 1961 to 1965.

Personal life
In 1918 he married Hovsångerska Irma Krook (1898–1993), the daughter of Nils Krook and Anna Jacobsson. Björck was the father of Flory (born 1919) and Sven (born 1923).

Dates of rank
1915 – Second lieutenant
19?? – Lieutenant
1928 – Captain
19?? – Major
1939 – Lieutenant colonel
1941 – Colonel
1949 – Major general

Awards and decorations

Swedish
   King Gustaf V's Jubilee Commemorative Medal (1948)
   King Gustaf V's Jubilee Commemorative Medal (1928)
   King Gustaf V's Commemorative Medal (1951)
   Commander 1st Class of the Order of the Sword (15 November 1947)
   Commander 1st Class of the Order of Vasa
   Knight of the Order of the Polar Star
   Swedish Voluntary Motor Transport Corps Merit Badge in gold
  Shooting Medal

Foreign
   Commander 2nd Class of the Order of the Dannebrog
   Commander of the Order of St. Olav
   Knight 1st Class of the Order of the White Rose of Finland
   Commander First Class of the Order of the Lion of Finland

Honours
Member of the Royal Swedish Academy of War Sciences (1939)

References

1893 births
1981 deaths
Swedish Army major generals
People from Vetlanda Municipality
Members of the Royal Swedish Academy of War Sciences
Commanders First Class of the Order of the Sword
Commanders First Class of the Order of Vasa
Knights of the Order of the Polar Star